Ji, also spelled Jee, Chi, or Chee, is a Korean family name, as well as a popular element in Korean given names. The meaning differs based on the hanja used to write it.

Family name
As a family name, Ji may be written with either of two hanja, one meaning "wisdom", and the other meaning "pond". Each has one bon-gwan: for the family name meaning "wisdom", Pongju Village, Pongsan County, North Hwanghae in what is today North Korea, and for the family name meaning "pond", Chungju, Chungcheongbuk-do in what is today South Korea.  The 2000 South Korean census found 147,572 people with this family name.

In a study by the National Institute of the Korean Language based on 2007 application data for South Korean passports, it was found that 79.5% of people with this surname spelled it in Latin letters as Ji in their passports. Another 9.0% spelled it as Jee, and 8.5% as Chi. Rarer alternative spellings (the remaining 3.0%) included Gi, Chee, Je, and Jy.

List
People with this family name include:

Ji Cheong-cheon (1888–1959), Korean independence activist
Ji Han-jae (born 1936), South Korean hapkido instructor
Jee Yong-ju (1948–1985), South Korean amateur boxer
Jee Man-won (born 1942), South Korean political scientist and journalist
Ji Suk-jin (born 1966), South Korean entertainer
Ji Sang-ryeol (born 1970), South Korean actor
Ji Jin-hee (born 1971), South Korean actor
Chi In-jin (born 1973), South Korean boxer
Ji Sang-jun (born 1973), South Korean swimmer
Ji Seung-hwan (born 1974), South Korean field hockey player
Ji Kyong-sun (born 1975), North Korean judo athlete
Ji Yun-nam (born 1976), North Korean footballer
Ji Seung-hyun (handballer) (born 1979), South Korean handball player
Ji Young-jun (born 1981), South Korean long distance runner
Ji Hyun-woo (born 1984), South Korean actor and musician
Jhi Yeon-woo (born 1984), South Korean female bodybuilder
Ji Eun-hee (born 1986), South Korean golfer
Ji Dong-won (born 1991), South Korean footballer
Ji Chang-wook (born 1987), South Korean actor
Ji Kyeong-deuk (born 1990), South Korean footballer
Ji So-yun (born 1991), South Korean footballer
Ji Yoon-ho (born Yoon Byung-ho, 1991), South Korean actor
Ien Chi (born 1991), American filmmaker of Korean descent
Ji Eun-sung (born 1991), South Korean actor
Ji Ha-yoon (born 1995), South Korean actress and model
Alexander Chee (fl. 2000s), American writer of Korean descent

Given name
There are 46 hanja with the reading "ji" on the South Korean government's official list of hanja which may be registered for use in given names. Some common ones are listed in the table at right. Many names containing this syllable have been popular throughout the late 20th and early 21st centuries, including:

As name element
Historically-popular given names formed with the syllable "ji" include:
Masculine

Ji-hoon (4th place in 1970, 1st place in 1980 and 1990, 2nd place in 2008, 3rd place in 2009, 8th place in 2011)
Ji-hu (2nd place in 2009, 7th place in 2011)

Feminine

Eun-ji (3rd place in 1990)
Min-ji (4th place in 1990)
Ji-eun (4th place in 1980, 2nd place in 1990)
Ji-hye (1st place in 1980 and 1990)
Ji-hyun (10th place in 1990)
Ji-min (3rd place in 2008, 6th place in 2009 and 2011)
Ji-woo (8th place in 2008, 4th place in 2009, 5th place in 2011)
Ji-yeon (7th place in 1980)
Ji-yoon (9th place in 2011)
Ji-young (1st place in 1970, 3rd place in 1980, 10th place in 1990)

Other names containing this syllable include:

First syllable

Ji-ae (feminine)
Ji-hae (feminine)
Ji-ho (unisex)
Ji-hwan (masculine)
Ji-hye (feminine)
Ji-na (feminine)
Ji-seok (masculine)
Ji-su (unisex)
Ji-tae (masculine)
Ji-won (unisex)
Ji-woong (masculine)

Second syllable

Su-ji (unisex)
Ye-ji (feminine)

People
People with the single-syllable given name Ji include:

Shin Ji (born 1981 as Lee Jee-seon), South Korean singer and lyricist

See also
List of Korean family names
List of Korean given names

References

Korean-language surnames
Korean given names